James Durcan is a Gaelic footballer for the Mayo senior team and also plays club football for Castlebar Mitchels. Along with his twin brother Paddy Durcan, James has appeared in both the 2014 All-Ireland Senior Club Football final and the 2016 All-Ireland Senior Club Football final with his club Castlebar Mitchels.

He started his first game for the Mayo Senior Football team against Limerick in the 2018 All-Ireland Senior Football Championship and scored a notable goal against Tipperary.

References

Living people
Mayo Gaelic footballers
1994 births